Scott Simons, FAIA (born 21 March 1954 in Rome, New York) is an American architect and planner based in Portland, Maine. He is a principal partner and founder of Scott Simons Architects.

Simons graduated cum laude with a Bachelor of Arts from Dartmouth College in 1976. He went on to receive a Master of Architecture from the University of Pennsylvania in 1980 where he also received an AIA School Medal and Certificate of Merit. Simons is recognized as a Distinguished Alum from the Institute for Civic Leadership (2008), and he has served as a design critic at the University of Pennsylvania, Harvard University, and Northeastern University.

Previous to establishing a firm bearing his name, Simons worked at the notable studios of Geddes Brecker Qualls Cunningham (1980–81), Marcel Breuer Associates (1981–83), and Sasaki Associates (1989-92).

The architect's self-designed residence, commonly labeled the Hillside House, creates "...space without definition and [has] a strong connection to the outside.” 

Simons is a founding member and past president of the Portland Society for Architecture, an American Institute of Architects board member, and a former board member of the Waynflete School and Yarmouth Arts. He has been instrumental to lauded transformations to historical buildings in Maine. In 2014, he was recognized for his effect on the built environment as one of Maine's fifty most influential people.

In 2015, Simons presented at Maine Live, a symposium of visionary Mainers.

As a member of the American Institute of Architects, he was elevated to a Fellow of the American Institute of Architects in 2016 in Category One: “To promote the aesthetic, scientific, and practical efficiency of the profession”.

References 

20th-century American architects
1954 births
Dartmouth College alumni
University of Pennsylvania School of Design alumni
Artists from Portland, Maine
People from Rome, New York
Living people
21st-century American architects